Alain Terrenoire (born 14 June 1941 in Lyon) is a French lawyer and politician (UNR party), a former Member of the National Assembly of France, a former Member of the European Parliament, and since 2004 the incumbent President of the Paneuropean Union. He is a former French delegate to the United Nations General Assembly.

He is the son of Louis Terrenoire, a former cabinet minister in the government of Charles de Gaulle.

Recognitions
 Chevalier de la Légion d'honneur
 Officier de l'Ordre national du Mérite

Publications
L'Europe et Maastricht, le pour et le contre
Le Parlement européen cet inconnu

References

1941 births
Living people
Politicians from Lyon
Union of Democrats for the Republic politicians
Rally for the Republic politicians
Deputies of the 3rd National Assembly of the French Fifth Republic
Deputies of the 4th National Assembly of the French Fifth Republic
Deputies of the 5th National Assembly of the French Fifth Republic
MEPs for France 1958–1979
Permanent Representatives of France to the United Nations
Lawyers from Lyon
Chevaliers of the Légion d'honneur
Officers of the Ordre national du Mérite